Amphimixis is the psychoanalytic term for the merging of pleasure-centres into an amorphous unity.

Early
Sandor Ferenczi introduced the term into psychoanalysis in Thalassa (1924), where he used it to describe the process of merging of the partial drives, to create a diffuse state of infant and childhood pleasure.  Ferenczi's idea was developed by Helene Deutsch in her description of female sexuality; but would subsequently be criticised for conflating forepleasure and end pleasure by Michael Balint.

Much later, amphimixis was extended to include a central pleasure centre in the self by Neville Symington, who saw it as providing the erotic basis for the self-love (amour propre) of the narcissist.

See also
Oral stage
Phallic monism
Psychosexual development

References

External links
Amphimixia/Amphimixis, International Dictionary of Psychoanalysis, Pierre Sabourin, 2005

Developmental psychology
Freudian psychology